The Nativity of Our Lord Chapel is a historic Russian Orthodox church located in Church Street, Ouzinkie, Alaska. Now it is under Diocese of Alaska of the Orthodox Church in America

The current building was built in 1906 as a replacement to an older, adjacent building from 1849 or 1855 that was left to deteriorate.  Its design was based on that of the 1888 Russian Orthodox church at Karluk, which itself was based upon the church at Belkofski.  This church has a relatively larger onion dome, though the onion dome is still small.

It was added to the National Register of Historic Places in 1980.

See also
National Register of Historic Places listings in Kodiak Island Borough, Alaska

References

Churches completed in 1906
Russian Orthodox church buildings in Alaska
Churches on the National Register of Historic Places in Alaska
Buildings and structures in Kodiak Island Borough, Alaska
Buildings and structures on the National Register of Historic Places in Kodiak Island Borough, Alaska